Thomas Price (1599–1685) was the Church of Ireland's Archbishop of Cashel.

Life
Price was born in Wales or possibly London, and educated at Trinity College, Dublin, where he graduated B.A. in 1623, M.A. in 1628, and was elected a fellow in 1626. He was ordained by William Bedell, and became archdeacon of Bedell's diocese of Kilmore. He was consecrated bishop of Kildare in Christ Church, Dublin, on 10 March 1661 by the Archbishop of Dublin James Margetson, and was translated to the archbishopric of Cashel on 20 May 1667.

Price followed Bedell on the importance of making the Irish language significant in the established church; he ordained some Irish-speaking ministers, and in 1678 he required service to be read in his cathedral from a folio Gaedhilic prayer-book presented to him by Andrew Sall. He encouraged Sall in his edition of the Irish Testament, and had himself some acquaintance with the Irish language.

Price died at Cashel on 4 August 1685.

Notes

Attribution

1599 births
1685 deaths
17th-century Welsh clergy
English people of Welsh descent
17th-century Irish Anglican priests
Anglican bishops of Kildare
Anglican archbishops of Cashel